The Daihatsu Fellow Max is a small Japanese automobile in the Kei car class. Originally introduced as the Daihatsu Fellow, the name was partially retained for the Max Cuore (1977) and then again for the 2000 Daihatsu Max.

360cc era

Fellow

On 9 November 1966, Daihatsu introduced the Fellow, also known as Daihatsu 360 in export markets. Originally only available in DeLuxe and Super DeLuxe equipment levels, a Standard version joined in February 1967. Also available with a wagon body (Fellow Van), as a mini-pickup truck and as a panel van from June 1967, the L37 was conventionally built with a front-mounted engine and rear wheel drive. It used a 23 PS iteration of the 356 cc, water-cooled two-cylinder two-stroke "ZM" engine already seen in the Hijet and a four-speed manual transmission. The self-lubricating ("Oil-Matic") little engine weighed only . The Fellow was the first Japanese car to be equipped with rectangular headlights.

As a result of Honda's 31 PS N360 being introduced early in 1967, a Kei-car horsepower war broke out, with Honda, Subaru, Suzuki, Mazda, and Mitsubishi contributing competitors. Daihatsu's response, the Fellow SS, was presented at the 1967 Tokyo Motor Show in October but did not go on sale until June the next year. A Le Mans-style sportscar prototype, the P-5 with the SS engine was shown alongside. The 32 PS "SS" could do the 400 meter sprint in 21.2 seconds.

The Fellow also received a slight facelift in October 1967, with a new dashboard and steering wheel most noticeable. Another minor change came in January 1969, with a fixed driver's side headrest and seatbelts installed because of new safety regulations. In July, along with what was literally a facelift (the front bumper was now mounted higher), the lesser engine's output increased to 26 PS and a comparatively luxurious "Custom" version was added at the top of the lineup. The size of the taillights also increased somewhat. An electric version called the Daihatsu Fellow Van EV went on sale in September 1969.

Fellow Buggy

A beach buggy version was introduced simultaneously with the other three body styles. While highly prized by collectors today, the Buggy only sold about 100 examples and was only available for a single model year. The 440 kg Fellow Buggy was not actually a "real" Fellow, as it was built on a Hijet S37 chassis, with fibre-reinforced plastic bodywork.

Fellow Max

In April 1970, the front-wheel drive L38 Daihatsu Fellow Max was introduced to replace the rear-wheel drive Fellow. Originally only available as a two-door sedan and three-door van (L38V), a hardtop coupé with a lower roofline and a somewhat baroque front-end treatment was added in August 1971 (L38GL). SL and GXL Hardtops received standard front disc brakes. In October 1972 a four-door version (L38F) appeared; it was the only four-door Kei car at the time of its introduction. Dimensions were 2,995 x 1,295 mm as dictated by the Kei car regulations, although the wheelbase was stretched by 100 mm to 2,090 mm. The engine was a 360 cc two-cylinder two-stroke ("ZM4"), offering  at the time of introduction. In July 1970 the SS version appeared, featuring a twin-carb, 40 PS (SAE) version of the ZM engine (ZM5) - a specific output of over 112 PS per litre. Top speed was 120 km/h, compared to 115 km/h for the lesser versions. In October 1972, for the '73 model year, engine outputs dropped somewhat, to 31 and 37 PS respectively to lower fuel consumption and meet new, more stringent emissions standards. These engines were called ZM12 and ZM13 respectively.

In export markets, this car was usually sold simply as the "Daihatsu 360". In Australia, where the car went on sale in early 1972 as a two-door sedan, it was called the Max 360X. It was the cheapest new car available in Australia at the time. It was also sold as the Daihatsu 360X in New Zealand.

The Fellow Max received a steady stream of facelifts during its existence. It underwent minor changes in March 1971 (new grille, dash modifications), March 1972 (new dash, round headlights and a new bonnet with longitudinal creases), May 1973 (changes to the fenders and new bumpers that fitted into the bodywork, and another new bonnet) and in October 1973 (new safety equipment). In February 1975 the bumpers were modified again, to allow for the fitment of new, larger license plates. The grille and front bumper arrangement was changed yet again. At the same time the interior saw some changes and the powerful twin-carb model was dropped as it wouldn't pass new emissions regulations. From now on, all models were equipped with the 31 PS "ZM12" engine. In May 1976 the car underwent more thorough changes as new Kei car regulations were introduced. This also marked the end of the Hardtop versions, which anyhow had lost relevance once the twin-carb engine was discontinued.

550cc era

In May 1976, responding to a change in the Kei car regulations, Daihatsu increased the Fellow Max' engine size to 547 cc and gave it a new chassis code (L40/L40V). The name remained, although the "Fellow" portion received less prominence and some marketing material simply referred to the car as the "Max 550". The new "AB10" four-stroke two-cylinder engine replaced the old two-cycle "ZM". This, developed with help from Toyota, was an overhead camshaft design (belt-driven) which also featured balance axles to smoothen the inherently imbalanced two-cylinder design.

With Honda withdrawing from the Kei passenger car segment, Daihatsu became the only maker to offer a Kei car featuring front-wheel drive. The Van used the front end and front doors from the two-door Max, but with a more square-rigged rear end featuring a split tailgate (divided horizontally) and a folding rear seat which allowed for a flat loading floor.

Max Cuore
In July 1977, the name was changed to Max Cuore (chassis code L45, although Vans remained L40V). The new name also heralded a wider body shell (up to ) which also increased the length to 3160 mm for the sedan and 3165 mm for the wagon. The front grille and emblems were changed, while the seats were improved and new colors (inside and out) became available. The Cuore Van, available in Standard, DeLuxe, and Super DeLuxe grades, now had  on tap.

In most of Europe, the car was simply called Daihatsu Cuore beginning in 1977, although it retained the "Max" prefix in some markets. Export versions received the same lower-powered engine as the Cuore Van did in Japan. 1980 saw the introduction of the parallel commercial series Daihatsu Mira, while the name "Max" finally disappeared entirely from the Cuore. In Japan, the 1979 Max Cuore was available as Standard (two-door), Deluxe (two or four doors), Custom (four-door), Hi-Custom (two or four doors), and Hi-Custom EX (four-door). The top of the line Hi-Custom EX was new for 1979.

2000s

The Daihatsu Max was a partial revival of the Daihatsu Fellow Max nameplate, appearing on October 10, 2001. Sales of the Daihatsu Max 5-door wagon began on November 1, using the same technical data as the second generation Move, though 10 mm lower. In 2006, the Max was replaced by the Sonica.

References

F
Kei cars
Cars introduced in 1966

ja:ダイハツ・フェロー